Lotto Dstny Ladies  is a women's professional cycling team based in Belgium, which competes in elite road bicycle racing and track cycling events, such as the UCI Women's World Tour. The team was established in 2006, and its colours are white, black, and red. The team manager and representative is Kurt Van De Wouwer, and the assistant team manager is Annelies Dom. Sponsors Lotto (associated with the Belgian lottery) and Soudal (an adhesives manufacturer) also sponsor the  men's UCI WorldTeam.

History

2006

2009

2014

Riders in 
In August the team announced the signing of Joëlle Numainville with immediate effect. Susanna Zorzi and Jessie Daams joined the team for 2015. On 29 October the team signed Anouk Rijff. On 13 November Carlee Taylor joined the team. On 21 November Anisha Vekemans, Marion Rousse, Sarah Rijkes, Molly Meyvisch, Chantal Hoffmann, Amy Cure and Isabelle Beckers signed extensions with the team.

Riders out
In July Emma Pooley announced that she intended to retire after the Commonwealth Games road race. In September Liesbet De Vocht announced her retirement. On 9 November Céline Van Severen left the team to join  for the 2015 season. On 23 November Heidi Dalton and Isabelle Söderberg left the team.

Team roster

Major wins

2006
Overall Wolvertem-Slozen, Liesbet De Vocht
Stages 1a & 1b, Liesbet De Vocht

2007
Stage 5 Women's Tour of New Zealand, Sara Carrigan
GP Stad Roeselare, Martine Bras
Oceania Continental Road Race Championships, Kathy Watt
Overall Tour de Perth, Kathy Watt
Stages 1, 2, 3 & 4, Kathy Watt
Stage 5 Holland Ladies Tour, Martine Bras
Stage 2 (ITT) Tour of Bright, Kathy Watt

2008
Omloop Door Middag-Humsterland WE, Vera Koedooder

2009
Stages 1 & 2 Women's Tour of New Zealand, Rochelle Gilmore
Omloop Door Middag-Humsterland WE, Rochelle Gilmore
Overall Tour Féminin en Limousin, Grace Verbeke
Stage 1, Grace Verbeke
Sparkassen Giro Bochum, Rochelle Gilmore
Profronde van Surhuisterveen WE, Vera Koedooder
Mijl van Mares WE, Vera Koedooder
Stage 6 Tour Cycliste Féminin International de l'Ardèche, Lizzie Armitstead

2010
Tour of Flanders for Women, Grace Verbeke
Holland Hills Classic, Grace Verbeke
Stage 2b Trophée d'Or Féminin, Vicki Whitelaw
 Overall Tour Cycliste Féminin International de l'Ardèche, Vicki Whitelaw
Commonwealth Games Road Race, Rochelle Gilmore

2011
Stage 1 Ladies Tour of Qatar, Rochelle Gilmore
Stage 2 Tour de Feminin-O cenu Českého Švýcarska, Melissa Hoskins
Profronde van Surhuisterveen WE, Melissa Hoskins

2012
Stage 4 Tour de Free State, Ashleigh Moolman
Stage 1 La Route de France, Cherise Taylor
Stage 2 Tour Cycliste Féminin International de l'Ardèche, Ashleigh Moolman

2013
Dwars door de Westhoek, Jolien D'Hoore
Holland Hills Classic,  Ashleigh Moolman
 Provincial Time Trial Championships (Antwerp), Anisha Vekemans

2014
 Provincial Time Trial Championship (Antwerp), Anisha Vekemans
 Provincial Time Trial Championship (Limburg), Isabelle Beckers
Beveren-Prosperpolder, Liesbet De Vocht
Diamond Tour, Jolien D'Hoore
 Mountains classification Giro d'Italia Femminile, Emma Pooley
Stages 6, 8 & 9, Emma Pooley
 Points classification BeNe Ladies Tour, Jolien D'Hoore
Stages 1 & 2b, Jolien D'Hoore
Stage 5 Holland Ladies Tour, Jolien D'Hoore

2015
 Provincial Time Trial Championship (Limburg), Jessie Daams
Boortmeerbeek, Anisha Vekemans
Stage 1 Festival Luxembourgeois du cyclisme féminin Elsy Jacobs, Elena Cecchini
Stage 4 Trophée d'Or Féminin, Anisha Vekemans
UCI Track Cycling World Cup – Cambridge (Team Pursuit), Amy Cure

2016
Oostduinkerke, Anisha Vekemans
Zeswege Ladies Classic, Lotte Kopecky
 Provincial Time Trial Championship (Antwerp), Anisha Vekemans
 Provincial Time Trial Championship (Limburg), Isabelle Beckers
Trofee Maarten Wynants, Lotte Kopecky
Belsele–Puivelde, Lotte Kopecky
Boortmeerbeek, Élise Delzenne
 Provincial Time Trial Championship (Vlaams-Brabant), Élise Delzenne
Fenioux Track Championships (Individual pursuit), Élise Delzenne
 Youth classification Belgium Tour, Lotte Kopecky
 Overall Trophée d'Or Féminin, Élise Delzenne
Stage 1, Élise Delzenne
Stage 5, Claudia Lichtenberg
UCI Track Cycling World Cup – Glasgow (Scratch Race), Élise Delzenne
Gent Six Days, Lotte Kopecky

2017
UCI Track Cycling World Cup – Cali (Omnium), Lotte Kopecky
Belgian International  – Madison, Lotte Kopecky 
 Provincial Time Trial Championship (Limburg), Isabelle Beckers
Stage 2 Grand Prix Elsy Jacobs, Élise Delzenne
Niel Derny race, Lotte Kopecky
Nossegem Cyclo-cross, Julie Roelandts
 Provincial Cyclo-cross Championships (Vlaams-Brabant), Julie Roelandts

2018
Stage 1 Belgium Tour, Lotte Kopecky

2019
Vuelta a la Comunitat Valenciana Feminas, Lotte Kopecky
MerXem Classic, Lotte Kopecky
Flanders Ladies Classic, Julie Van de Velde
GP de Fourmies, Nguyễn Thị Thật

2022
Wiekevorst Cyclo-cross, Sterre Vervloet
Wuustwezel Cyclo-cross, Sterre Vervloet

National and world champions

2006
 Australian Time Tria, Kathryn Watt
 Irish Road Race, Siobhan Horgane-Dervan
 Belgian Time Trial, An Van Rie
2007
 Belgian Track (Individual Pursuit), Kelly Druits
 Belgian Track (Keirin), Kelly Druits
 Belgian Track (Team Sprint), Kelly Druits & Jenifer De Merlier
 Belgian Track (Points race), Kelly Druits
 Irish Road Race, Siobhan Horgane-Dervan
2008
 Norwegian Road Race, Linn Torp
 Dutch Track (Points Race), Vera Koedooder
2009
, British Track (Points Race), Lizzie Armitstead
 Norwegian Road Race, Linn Torp
, British Track (Scratch  Race), Lizzie Armitstead
2010
 Australian U23 Time Trial, Josephine Tomic
 Australian Track (Team Pursuit), Josephine Tomic
 Belgian Time Trial, Grace Verbeke
2011
 South African Time Trial, Cherise Taylor
 South African Road Race, Marissa van der Merwe
 African Individual Time Trial, Cherise Taylor
 African Road Race, Ashleigh Moolman
2012
 South African Trial, Cherise Taylor
 South African Road Race, Ashleigh Moolman
 African Individual Time Trial, Ashleigh Moolman
 African Road Race, Ashleigh Moolman
2013
 South African Time Trial, Ashleigh Moolman
 South African Road Race, Ashleigh Moolman
 African Time Trial, Ashleigh Moolman
 African Road Race, Ashleigh Moolman
2014
 Australian Track (Individual pursuit), Amy Cure
 Australian Track (Team pursuit) Amy Cure
 British Time Trial, Emma Pooley
 Belgian Road Race, Jolien D'Hoore
2015
 Australian Track (Team pursuit) Amy Cure
 Australian Track (Individual pursuit) Amy Cure
 World Track (Team pursuit), Amy Cure
 Italy Road Race, Elena Cecchini
2016
 South African Road Race, An-Li Kachelhoffer
 Belgian Track (Omnium), Lotte Kopecky
 Belgian U23 Time Trial, Lotte Kopecky
 African Team Time Trial, An-Li Kachelhoffer
 European U23 Track (Points race), Lotte Kopecky
 European U23 Track (Omnium), Lotte Kopecky
 France Track (Individual pursuit), Élise Delzenne
 France Track (Points Race), Élise Delzenne
 European Track (Madison), Lotte Kopecky
 Belgian Track (Scratch race), Lotte Kopecky
 Belgian Track (Points race), Lotte Kopecky
2017
 Belgian Track (Omnium), Lotte Kopecky
 Belgian Track (Points Race), Lotte Kopecky
 Belgian Track (Scratch Race), Lotte Kopecky
 World Track (Madison), Lotte Kopecky
 Denmark Track (Individual Pursuit), Trine Schmidt 
 Denmark Track (Scratch Race), Trine Schmidt 
 European Track (Points race), Trine Schmidt 
 European Track (Scratch race), Trine Schmidt 
2018
 Belgian Track (Points race), Annelies Dom
 Belgian Road Race, Annelies Dom
2019
 Belgian Time Trial, Lotte Kopecky
2020
 Belgian Time Trial, Lotte Kopecky
 Belgian Road Race, Lotte Kopecky
2022
 Belgian Track (Omnium), Katrijn De Clercq
 Belgian Track (Points race), Katrijn De Clercq
 Belgian Mountainbike (Beachrace), Mieke Docx

Previous team rosters

References

External links

Christine Vardaros comments on her cycling career between December 2006 and February 2007
Photo of rider Sara Carrigan in Lotto-Belisol Ladiesteam gear
Photo of rider Kathy Watt coming 9th in 3rd stage of the Tour de l'Aude, 1966
Photo of rider Ludivine Henrion

 
Cycling teams based in Belgium
UCI Women's Teams
Cycling teams established in 2006